English Silver Before the Civil War is Timothy Schroder's account of English domestic and church silver from a little before the Tudor age (1485–1603) to the threshold of the Civil War (1642–51).

Summary
Focusing on a private collection formed over the last thirty years, the book also "provides a general introduction to the silver trade and to dining customs of the period."

Critical reception
Writing in The Art Newspaper, Tessa Murdoch praised the book's "accessible text, exemplary silver photography, elegant design and careful editing". Her remarks were reinforced by Kirstin Kennedy in her review in The Burlington Magazine: "Schroder’s clear, thoughtful account . . . marries object-based evidence with visual and documentary sources . . . The arguments of the text are supported by superb photographs . . . a clear layout and a detailed index." In Silver Magazine, Dorothea Burstyn commented favourably on the book's production: "As with all books published by John Adamson, this volume has a very pleasing and elegant layout with gorgeous photography." Philippa Glanville captured the book's quintessence when she wrote in Silver Studies: "From the first glance, the book is a celebration of the period, as well as of specific objects, and this shines through in every aspect."

References

External links
 Publisher's official website

2015 non-fiction books
British non-fiction books
Silver